This is a list of moths of the family Choreutidae that are found in India. It also acts as an index to the species articles and forms part of the full List of moths of India.

Anthophila cothurnata (Meyrick, 1912)
Anthophila dichlora (Meyrick, 1912)
Anthophila diplogramma (Meyrick, 1912)
Anthophila eumetra (Meyrick, 1912)
Anthophila fabriciana (Linnaeus, 1767)
Anthophila halimora (Meyrick, 1912)
Anthophila holachyrma (Meyrick, 1912)
Anthophila lethaea (Meyrick, 1912)
Anthophila oreina Diakonoff, 1979
Anthophila sandaracina (Meyrick, 1907)
Anthophila strepsidesma (Meyrick, 1912)
Anthophila trogalia Meyrick (Meyrick, 1912)
Brenthia ardens Meyrick, 1912
Brenthia buthusalis (Walker, 1863)
Brenthia catenata Meyrick, 1907
Brenthia dendronympha Meyrick 1937
Brenthia luminifera Meyrick, 1912
Choreutis aegyptiaca (Zeller, 1867)
Choreutis achyrodes (Meyrick, 1912)
Choreutis euclista (Meyrick, 1918)
Choreutis ialeura (Meyrick, 1912)
Choreutis itriodes (Meyrick, 1912)
Choreutis melophaga (Meyrick, 1931)
Choreutis ophiosema (Lower, 1896)
Choreutis orthogona (Meyrick, 1886)
Litobrenthia carola (Meyrick, 1912)
Litobrenthia coronigera (Meyrick, 1918)
Peotyle atmodesma (Meyrick, 1933)
Prochoreutis halimora (Meyrick, 1912)
Prochoreutis hestiarcha (Meyrick, 1912)
Prochoreutis sehestediana (Fabricius, 1776)
Tebenna bjerkandrella (Thunberg, 1784)
Tebenna bradleyi Clarke, 1971

References

 

M